Oleksandr Sosnenko (born 9 November 1971) is a Ukrainian former competitive ice dancer. With Svitlana Chernikova, he won silver at the 1994 Prague Skate and at the 1994 Ukrainian Championships. The two competed at the 1994 Winter Olympics in Lillehammer, placing 19th. They were coached by Halyna Churilova.

Sosnenko has worked as a skating coach in Kiev.

Competitive highlights 
with Chernikova

References 

1971 births
Figure skaters at the 1994 Winter Olympics
Olympic figure skaters of Ukraine
Ukrainian male ice dancers
Living people